The Central Centaur IV, a.k.a. Central C.F.5, was a British civil two/three-seat biplane aircraft produced by Central Aircraft Company Limited of London.

History
The Centaur IV was a two-seat wire-braced, fabric-covered wooden biplane designed by A.A. Fletcher. It was the first original design to be built by Central Aircraft Company at Kilburn, London during 1919. The prototype had a 70 hp (52 kW) Renault air-cooled V-8 engine but the seven production aircraft were fitted with an Anzani radial engine.

The Centaur IV was originally proposed in two versions:
A two-seat aircraft, with the two seats side-by-side in an open cockpit;
A three-seat aircraft, with two seats side-by-side and the open cockpit extended to allow installation of a third (single) seat.

No market existed for private ownership at that time, so the eight aircraft were all built as three-seaters. All the aircraft were initially used by Central Aircraft for joyriding or instruction at Northolt Aerodrome. The fifth aircraft was fitted with a three-float undercarriage. It was used for a week giving joyrides at Southend-on-Sea. It was converted into a landplane later in 1920 and crashed in October 1920.

As the postwar slump continued, some of the aircraft were sold in Belgium and were still operating in 1938. The last survivor was destroyed in the German invasion of Belgium in May 1940.

Variants
 Centaur IV – dual-control version
 Centaur IVA – single-pilot version
 Centaur IVB – float landing gear

Operators

Central Aircraft Flying School

Specifications (Centaur IVA)

References

External links
Central Centaur IV – British Aircraft Directory

1910s British civil utility aircraft
Centaur 4
Biplanes
Single-engined tractor aircraft
Aircraft first flown in 1919